Katie Hannon (born August 1971) is an Irish journalist, radio and television presenter employed by RTÉ. She has hosted her own self-titled weekly current affairs television programme, Upfront with Katie Hannon, since January 2023. She previously presented RTÉ Radio 1's political radio programmes, The Late Debate and Saturday with Katie Hannon.

Career
Hannon was educated in both Duagh National School and Presentation Secondary School Listowel, County Kerry and she studied journalism in the Dublin Institute of Technology in Rathmines and Aungier Street.

Hannon was previously political correspondent for Evening Herald from 1992 to 1999 and also for Irish Examiner from 1999 to 2001. She was political editor of Ireland on Sunday from 2002 to 2004.

Hannon joined RTÉ in 2004. She appeared on a 2004 episode of The Panel.

During the late 2000s and early 2010s she presented Prime Time at phases.

From 2018 to 2022, she presented RTÉ Radio 1's political radio programmes, The Late Debate and Saturday with Katie Hannon, and a relief presenter of Liveline.

In November 2022, RTÉ announced that Hannon would take over from Claire Byrne on Monday nights as presenter of Upfront with Katie Hannon, a new current affairs programme, beginning January 2023.

Bibliography
The Naked Politician (2004)

References

External links

Living people
Irish investigative journalists
Irish women journalists
Irish radio presenters
Irish women radio presenters
RTÉ newsreaders and journalists
1971 births